USS Partridge (AMS-31/YMS-437) was a  built for the United States Navy in World War II.

History
Partridge was laid down as YMS-437 on 3 October 1944 by J. M. Martinac Corp., Tacoma, Washington; launched 22 April 1945; and commissioned 25 July 1945.

Upon fitting out, YMS-437 reported to the U.S. Pacific Fleet for duty on 16 August. Assigned to the First Fleet, YMS-437 conducted operations in the Hawaiian Islands area and along the U.S. West Coast. She was reclassified and named Partridge (AMS-31) 18 February 1947.

In late 1951, Partridge joined the U.S. forces in Korea. Ordered to assist in clearing Wonsan Harbor of mines, the little minesweeper struck a mine and sank 2 February 1951. Eight of her crew were killed and six were wounded. She was struck from the Naval Vessel Register on 27 February.

References

External links 
 
 Casualties of Ship Sinkings & Damaged Vessels

YMS-1-class minesweepers of the United States Navy
Ships built in Tacoma, Washington
1945 ships
World War II minesweepers of the United States
Korean War minesweepers of the United States
Shipwrecks in the Sea of Japan
Ships sunk by mines
Maritime incidents in 1951